Wattam is a 2019 puzzle-platform game developed by Funomena and published by Annapurna Interactive. It was designed by Keita Takahashi, better known for creating the Katamari Damacy series, and was released for PlayStation 4 and Windows on December 17.

Gameplay 
The game is played either solo or co-op, and consists of befriending other inhabitants of the world, including trees, flowers, rocks, toilets, poop, mouths, and more by holding hands, uncovering secrets, playing minigames, and solving puzzles. Characters each have unique melodies, which can be combined.

Development 
Originally revealed in December 2014 as a PlayStation 4 exclusive, Wattam was to be published by Sony Interactive Entertainment and developed jointly by Funomena and Santa Monica Studio. However, it was revealed in October 2016 that Sony were no longer involved with the game. In August 2017, Annapurna Interactive was announced as the new publisher, and that it would additionally be released for Microsoft Windows.

Regarding Wattam, designer Keita Takahashi said that he was "always" trying to make a game that makes people notice how "our ordinary life is great".

Wattam had a troubled development at Funomena. Takahashi quarreled with studio co-founder Robin Hunicke over the game's design and production, eventually building a physical barricade between their sides of the office. Hunicke withdrew from active involvement in the game's development to focus on running the company. After Sony ended its co-development with Funomena, the studio announced layoffs. The game would ultimately spend over five years in development.

Reception

Wattam received "mixed or average reviews" from critics upon release according to review aggregator Metacritic.

The game was nominated for "Family", "Game Design", and "Music" at the 16th British Academy Games Awards.

References

Further reading

External links 

 

Action video games
Indie video games
Multiplayer and single-player video games
PlayStation 4 games
2019 video games
Video games developed in the United States
Windows games
Annapurna Interactive games
Video games designed by Keita Takahashi